Danny Pang Phat (born 1965) is one of the Pang brothers. The twin brothers Oxide and Danny Pang started their career in Hong Kong, where Oxide worked as colourist and Danny as editor. After moving to Bangkok, Oxide made the experimental film Who's Running. Bangkok Dangerous is the first film in which the brothers combine their talents.

Career 
Pang started his career as an editor working on numerous Hong Kong films such as The Storm Riders and the Infernal Affairs series, he also wrote and directed Neung Buak Neung Pen Soon (also known as 1+1=0 or Nothing To Lose), which was released in 2002. He also directed the Chinese horror thriller The Strange House.

Filmography
 The Strange House (2015) as director
 The Mirror (2015) as director
 Blind Spot (2015) as director
 Delusion (2016) as director

References

External links 
 
 The Pang Brothers

1965 births
Living people
Hong Kong people of Thai descent
Danny Pang Phat
Hong Kong twins
Hong Kong film directors
Hong Kong film editors